Carmen Filpi (March 22, 1923–May 9, 2003) was an American character actor who starred in films and on television.

Biography
His first acting job was in the 1969 film Wild Gypsies. He also starred in The Ice Pirates (1984), Pee-Wee's Big Adventure (1985), Life Stinks (1991), and The Wedding Singer (1998). Carmen also acted in the 2000 made-for-TV film Goodbye Casanova with Yasmine Bleeth. Carmen's final film was in the 2002 film Eight Crazy Nights. 

He also starred in the 1988 horror film Halloween 4: The Return of Michael Myers as the Reverend Jackson P. Sayer.

Filpi made many guest appearances in TV series. Some of those appearances range from Baretta, Barney Miller, WKRP in Cincinnati, Quantum Leap, Married...with Children, Growing Pains, and Sabrina, the Teenage Witch. He had a recurring role in the short-lived series Freebie and the Bean. He died of cancer at the age of 80.

Filmography

Wild Gypsies (1969)—Felipe
Garden of the Dead (1972)—Nolan
Perpetual Motion Machine (1973)—Man
Capone (1975)—Waiter
Which Way Is Up? (1977)—Wino
The Lord of the Rings (1978)  
Boulevard Nights (1979)—Mr. Diaz
On the Nickel (1980)
Escape from New York (1981)—Bum
Carbon Copy (1981)—Wino
10 to Midnight (1983)—Hotel Clerk
The Ice Pirates (1984)—Vendor
The Sure Thing (1985)—Bus Station Bum
Pee-Wee's Big Adventure (1985)—Hobo Jack
The Boys Next Door (1985)—Bum
Runaway Train (1985)—Signal Maintainer
My Chauffeur (1986)—Mop Man
Hollywood Zap! (1986)—Magazine Vendor
Walk Like a Man (1987)—Butler
Who's That Girl (1987)—Street Bum #1
Beetlejuice (1988)—Messenger
Halloween 4: The Return of Michael Myers (1988)—Rev. Jackson P. Sayer
Harlem Nights (1989)—Doorman
Repo Jake (1990)—Amos
Iron Maze (1991)—Charlie
Alligator II: The Mutation (1991)—Wino Henry
Life Stinks (1991)—Pops (Elevens-Up)
Wayne's World (1992)—Old Man Withers
The Larry Sanders Show (1992)—Bert Crawley
The Beverly Hillbillies (1993)—Frank
Ed Wood (1994)—Old Crusty Man
Meet Wally Sparks (1997)—Bum
MouseHunt (1997)—Pallbearer #4
The Wayans Bros. (1997)—Officer Young
The Wedding Singer (1998)—Old Man in Bar
Phoenix (1998)—Locksmith
Dante's View (1998)—Hall of Famer
Knowing (2000)
Goodbye Casanova (2000)—Festus
The 4th Tenor (2002)—Bum #1
Eight Crazy Nights (2002)—Homeless Guy (voice)
Back by Midnight (2002)—Herbert (final film role)

References

External links

1923 births
2003 deaths
20th-century American male actors
21st-century American male actors
American male film actors
American male television actors
Male actors from Boston
Deaths from cancer in Washington, D.C.